"Mr. Hankey's Christmas Classics" is the fifteenth episode of the third season of the animated television series South Park and the 46th episode of the series overall. An album of the same name consisting of versions of songs from the show as well as a number of additional songs was released the week prior to the episode's original air date, December 1, 1999.

Plot 
The episode is styled as a variety show and features Mr. Hankey as the host; he sits by the fire in his sewer home and introduces shorts featuring unusual holiday songs. In a similar fashion to "Starvin' Marvin in Space", the episode was dedicated to Mary Kay Bergman, the original voice of most of the female characters on the show up to that point, who had committed suicide less than a month earlier. Since the episode features audio from the Christmas Classics album, which had been recorded months earlier, it marks the final episode in which Bergman's voice is heard. During the performance of Have Yourself a Merry Little Christmas, a brief montage of several of Bergman's characters are shown and some gather within Mr. Hankey's home afterwards to sing.

During "The Dreidel Song", Gerald Broflovski sings his admiration for Courteney Cox, who is according to him, 'hot' on that show.

During the "Christmas Time in Hell" song Satan is singing along with various celebrities in Hell, including Jeffrey Dahmer, John F. Kennedy, John F. Kennedy, Jr., Diana, Princess of Wales, Gene Siskel, Mao Zedong, Genghis Khan, Michael Landon and Jimmy Stewart. A framed picture of comedian Andy Dick is also seen during the dance number.

Songs/scenes 
 "Mr. Hankey The Christmas Poo", performed by a postman (a reference to Fred Astaire's character in Santa Claus Is Comin' to Town), Mr. Hankey and the students of South Park Elementary (students voiced by the voice actors of Ike Broflovski)
 "Dreidel, Dreidel, Dreidel (The Dreidel Song)", performed by Kyle Broflovski, with Eric Cartman, Stan Marsh, and Gerald, Sheila and Ike Broflovski
 "O Tannenbaum", performed by Adolf Hitler
 "Christmas Time In Hell", performed by Satan and the damned
 "Carol of the Bells", performed by Mr. Mackey
 "O Holy Night", incorrectly performed by Eric Cartman
 "Merry Fucking Christmas", performed by Mr. Garrison
 "I Saw Three Ships", performed by Shelley Marsh
 A Christmas medley performed by Jesus and Santa Claus as lounge singers, featuring: "Joy to the World", "Up On the House Top", "Away in a Manger", "O Come All Ye Faithful", "Hark! The Herald Angels Sing", "Silent Night", "Rio", and "Let it Snow"
 "Have Yourself a Merry Little Christmas", performed by Mr. Hankey and the cast. During the scene, Kenny is killed when a chandelier falls on him. 
 During the ending credits a reprise of "Dreidel Dreidel Dreidel" plays.

"Fighting the frizzies, at eleven." 
After every commercial break, a live action segment featuring a news anchor is shown, saying "Fighting the frizzies, at eleven." In the DVD commentary, Stone and Parker indicate this is a reference to a bootleg tape of Star Wars Holiday Special. The original tape featured a brief clip at the end from WCBS-TV featuring newscaster Rolland Smith informing viewers, "Fighting the frizzies, at eleven." However, while the original news ad was apparently referring to "frizzy" hair, the ending credits of this episode of South Park feature the news anchor boxing a man in a giant fuzzy suit. The announcements were followed by Hanky's show's logo, which is based on that of Star Wars.

Reception
In September 2008, Russian prosecutors filed a motion to ban the series based on complaints received about this episode. The TV station was allowed to keep its license by agreeing not to re-air the program.

Ted Gournelos called "Merry Fucking Christmas" as sung by Mr. Garrison, "ridiculously offensive".

Album 

The album features more songs than the show. Additionally, some of those featured in the show  are slightly different than the aired versions. The album reached #33 on Billboard's 1999 Christmas albums. The duet between Santa and Jesus that appears in the episode was meant for the album, but music rights for Duran Duran's "Rio" could not be cleared for the album in time.

Personnel
Credits are adapted from the album's liner notes.

Voices
 Trey Parker – Stan Marsh, Eric Cartman, Mr. Hankey, Cowboy Timmy, Mr. Garrison, Juan Schwartz, Mr. Mackey, Adolf Hitler, Satan, Mr. Ose, "special celebrity guest"
 Matt Stone – Kyle Broflovski, Kenny McCormick, Gerald Broflovski
 Mary Kay Bergman – Shelley Marsh, Wendy Testaburger, Sheila Broflovski
 Isaac Hayes – Chef

Personnel
 Trey Parker – electric and acoustic guitars
 Matt Stone – bass guitars, drums and percussion
 Marc Shaiman – piano and keyboards, arrangements and orchestrations
 Harvey Cohen, Mervyn Warren, Frank Bennett – orchestrations
 Bruce Howell – guitars on "The Lonely Jew on Christmas" and "What the Hell Child Is This?"
 Neil Stubenhaus – bass guitars on "The Lonely Jew on Christmas" and "What the Hell Child Is This?"
 John Robinson – drums on "The Lonely Jew on Christmas" and "What the Hell Child Is This?"
 Dan Higgins – saxophone on "What the Hell Child Is This?"

Production
 Trey Parker, Matt Stone, Marc Shaiman – production and performance
 Bruce Howell – production on "Santa Claus Is on His Way" and "Hark! The Herald Angels Sing"
 Nick Vidar – recording
 Joe Atlas – photography
 Monster X – design

Singles
 "Mr. Hankey, The Christmas Poo" UK no. 4
 CD1
 "Mr. Hankey, The Christmas Poo" – Performed by Cowboy Timmy
 "Cheesy Poofs (Theme)" – Performed by Eric Cartman
 "Chocolate Salty Balls" (Karaoke Version) – Performed by Chef

 CD2
 "Mr. Hankey, The Christmas Poo" – Performed by Cowboy Timmy
 "My Best Friends" (Snippet) – Performed by Eric Cartman
 "Swiss Colony Beef Log" – Performed by Eric Cartman

References

External links 

 "Mr. Hankey's Christmas Classics" Full episode at South Park Studios
 

1999 Christmas albums
1999 soundtrack albums
1999 American television episodes
Cultural depictions of Adolf Hitler
Depictions of Genghis Khan on television
Cultural depictions of Mao Zedong
Cultural depictions of John F. Kennedy
Albums produced by Rick Rubin
American Christmas television episodes
South Park (season 3) episodes
South Park albums
South Park songs
Television animation soundtracks
Television episodes set in hell